Belmonte is one of 15 parishes (administrative divisions)  in Belmonte de Miranda, a municipality of the same name, within the province and autonomous community of Asturias, in northern Spain. The village of Belmonte is the seat of the parish.

The villages include: Albariza, L'Abiosa, Belmonte, Cezana, Colladiellu, Courias, Las Cruces, Dolia, La Durera, L'Estilleiru, El Faéu, Faidieḷḷu, Freisnéu, La Granda, Meruxa, Montescusu, Pascual, El Pousadoriu, La Repenerencia, Tabláu, Tiblós and La Vellosa.

The village offers famous catch-and-release trout fishing.

References 

Parishes in Belmonte de Miranda